Dasho Dechen Wangmo is a Bhutanese politician who has been Minister for Health since November 2018. She has been a member of the National Assembly of Bhutan, since October 2018.

Early life and education

She received a Master of Public Health (Global Health Epidemiology) degree from Yale University, United States and Bachelor of Science in Cardiopulmonary Science from the Northeastern University, United States.

Professional career
Wangmo is served as the director of PIE Solutions. She is the chairwoman and a founding member of Bhutan Cancer Society, a non-profit organization in Bhutan.

Political career
Wangmo is a member of Druk Nyamrup Tshogpa (DNT).

She was elected to the National Assembly of Bhutan in the 2018 elections for the North Thimphu constituency. She received 2,276 votes and defeated Lily Wangchuk, a candidate of Druk Phuensum Tshogpa.

On November 3, Lotay Tshering formally announced his cabinet structure and Wangmo was named as Minister for Health. On November 7, 2018, she was sworn in as Minister for Health in the cabinet of Prime Minister Lotay Tshering.

Since 2020, Wangmo has also been a member of the Global Leaders Group on Antimicrobial Resistance, co-chaired by Sheikh Hasina and Mia Mottley.

Honours

National honours
  :
  The Royal Red Scarf (17/12/2020).

References 

Living people
Bhutanese politicians
Bhutanese women in politics
Yale School of Public Health alumni
Northeastern University alumni
1976 births
Bhutanese MNAs 2018–2023
Lotay Tshering ministry
Druk Nyamrup Tshogpa politicians
Druk Nyamrup Tshogpa MNAs
Health ministers of Bhutan
Women government ministers of Bhutan